Pseudomiza is a genus of moths in the family Geometridae.

Species
Pseudomiza annulata (Warren, 1899)
Pseudomiza argentilinea (Moore, 1868)
Pseudomiza aurata Wileman, 1915
Pseudomiza castanearia (Moore, 1868)
Pseudomiza ctenogyna Prout, 1916
Pseudomiza flavitincta (Wileman, 1915)
Pseudomiza leucogonia (Hampson, 1895)
Pseudomiza obliquaria (Leech, 1897)
Pseudomiza opaca Joicey & Talbot, 1917
Pseudomiza punctinalis Beyer, 1958
Pseudomiza uniformis Inoue, 1992

References
Natural History Museum Lepidoptera genus database

Ennominae